Spiris bipunctata is a moth in the family Erebidae. It was described by Otto Staudinger in 1892. It is found in Russia (western Sayan Mountains, southern Krasnoyarskii Krai, Tuva, Transbaikalia, Middle Amur), central and eastern Mongolia and China (Xinjiang, Qinghai, Shanxi, Heilongjiang).

References

Moths described in 1892
Callimorphina